Hüseyin Diriöz is a retired Turkish ambassador, most notably serving as Ambassador to Moscow and as former Assistant Secretary General of NATO for Defence Policy and Planning.

Personal life
After completing high school at the Tarsus American College in Mersin, Turkey, Hüseyin Diriöz attended Ankara University, where he studied Political Sciences, and the University of Virginia, where he gained his MA.
Ambassador Diriöz is married to Sibel and they have two children.

Career
Ambassador Diriöz is a career diplomat who served his country for 30 years before he joined the NATO.
He first joined the Turkish Ministry of Foreign Affairs in 1978 and served in Kabul and Strasbourg before attending the NATO Defence College in Rome in 1987/88. He then returned to the Ministry of Foreign Affairs for a further year before joining the Turkish Delegation to NATO for four years.

In 1993, Ambassador Diriöz joined the NATO International Staff as Head of the Defence Policy Section and in 1996 he returned to the Ministry of Foreign Affairs in Ankara. From 1998 to 2000 he was Minister-Counsellor in the Turkish Embassy, Washington DC, and on his return he became the Spokesman for the Ministry of Foreign Affairs. From 2004 to 2008 he was Turkey’s Ambassador to Jordan after which he returned to the Ministry in Ankara for a year before becoming the Chief Foreign Policy Advisor to the President of Turkey, Abdullah Gul.

In 2010, he was appointed as Assistant Secretary General of NATO for Defence Policy and Planning. After his tenure at NATO, he served as Turkish Ambassador to Brasilia. Subsequently, he was appointed as Turkish Ambassador to Moscow in 2016.

North Atlantic Treaty Organization
Hüseyin Diriöz served at the NATO International Staff as Assistant Secretary General from October 2010 for a duration of three years.
The Defence Policy and Planning Division, which he directed and managed, has the lead on defence related issues such as defence transformation, defence capabilities, defence planning, logistics, missile defence and nuclear policy.

The Division is responsible for developing political guidance for the implementation of NATO’s new Strategic Concept, in particular to guide the work undertaken during the NATO Defence Planning Process, and is also responsible for the defence related aspects of cooperation between NATO and the European Union, notably in the field of defence planning and capability development. In addition, the Division is responsible for the political-military and defence related aspects of cooperation with partners and International Organisations.

External links

 Hüseyin Diriöz official NATO website

References

21st-century Turkish diplomats
Ambassadors of Turkey to Jordan
Ambassadors of Turkey to Russia
Ambassadors of Turkey to Brazil
NATO officials
Tarsus American College alumni
Ankara University alumni
NATO Defense College alumni
Living people
1956 births